Vukomanović (Cyrillic script: Вукомановић) is a Serbian surname. Notable people with the surname include:

Branislav Vukomanović (born 1981), Serbian footballer
Ivan Vukomanović (born 1977), Serbian footballer
Leontina Vukomanović (born 1970), female singer from Serbia
Ljubica Vukomanović (1788–1843), Serbian royal consort
Mirjana Vukomanović (born 1967), Serbian film, television and theater director

Serbian surnames